Depressaria kailai is a moth in the family Depressariidae. It was described by Alexandr L. Lvovsky in 2009. It is found in Kazakhstan and Tajikistan.

References

Moths described in 2009
Depressaria
Moths of Asia